FC Aluston-YUBK Alushta is an association football team based in Alushta, 
Crimea.

It was founded in 2015 in Feodosia, where it remained until the 2020/21 season. Then the club moved to Alushta.

Team names
Source:
 2015–2018: FC Kafa Feodosia
 2018–2021: FC Favorite-VD-Kafa Feodosia
 2021–present: FC Aluston-YUBK Alushta

League and cup history (Crimea)
{|class="wikitable"
|-bgcolor="#efefef"
! Season
! Div.
! Pos.
! Pl.
! W
! D
! L
! GS
! GA
! P
!Domestic Cup
!colspan=2|Europe
!Notes
|-
|align=center|2015
|align=center|1st All-Crimean Championship Gr. A
|align=center|4/10
|align=center|9
|align=center|5
|align=center|0
|align=center|4
|align=center|15
|align=center|14
|align=center|15
|align=center|
|align=center|
|align=center|
|align=center bgcolor=brick|Reorganization of competitions
|-
|align=center|2015–16
|align=center|1st Premier League
|align=center|6/8
|align=center|28
|align=center|9
|align=center|6
|align=center|13
|align=center|31
|align=center|45
|align=center|33
|align=center|Group stage
|align=center|
|align=center|
|align=center|
|-
|align=center|2016–17
|align=center|1st Premier League
|align=center|6/8
|align=center|28
|align=center|7
|align=center|8
|align=center|13
|align=center|46
|align=center|49
|align=center|29
|align=center bgcolor=tan| finals
|align=center|
|align=center|
|align=center|
|-
|align=center|2017–18
|align=center|1st Premier League
|align=center|7/8
|align=center|28
|align=center|5
|align=center|2
|align=center|21
|align=center|22
|align=center|73
|align=center|17
|align=center| finals
|align=center|
|align=center|
|align=center bgcolor=pink|1st–2nd league match (defeat, relegated)
|- align=center bgcolor=LightCyan
|align=center|2018–19
|align=center|2nd Open Championship
|align=center bgcolor=gold|1/17
|align=center|29
|align=center|25
|align=center|2
|align=center|2
|align=center|112
|align=center|26
|align=center|77
|align=center|
|align=center|
|align=center|
|align=center bgcolor=lightgreen|Promoted
|-
|align=center|2019–20
|align=center|1st Premier League
|align=center|7/8
|align=center|28
|align=center|7
|align=center|2
|align=center|19
|align=center|25
|align=center|56
|align=center|23
|align=center| finals
|align=center|
|align=center|
|align=center|1st–2nd league match (winner)
|-
|align=center|2020–21
|align=center|1st Premier League
|align=center|8/8
|align=center|28
|align=center|3
|align=center|2
|align=center|23
|align=center|25
|align=center|95
|align=center|11
|align=center| finals
|align=center|
|align=center|
|align=center|spared of relegation, because Krymteplytsia withdrawal from the league
|-
|align=center|2021–22
|align=center|1st Premier League
|align=center|
|align=center|
|align=center|
|align=center|
|align=center|
|align=center|
|align=center|
|align=center|
|align=center| finals
|align=center|
|align=center|
|align=center|
|-
|}

References

External links
Official website 

Football clubs in Crimea
Association football clubs established in 2015
2015 establishments in Russia
Sports team relocations
Alushta